"Who I Am with You" is a song written by Marv Green, Paul Jenkins and Jason Sellers and recorded by American country music artist Chris Young.  It was released in January 2014 as the second single from Young’s 2013 album A.M..

"Who I Am with You" peaked at numbers two and eight on both the Billboard Country Airplay and Hot Country Songs charts respectively. It also charted at number 48 on the Hot 100. The song was certified Gold by the Recording Industry Association of America (RIAA), and has sold 565,000 copies in the United States as of August 2014. It achieved similar chart success in Canada, peaking at number six on the Canada Country chart and number 72 on the Canadian Hot 100.

The accompanying music video for the song was directed by Trey Fanjoy.

Reception

Critical
The song received a favorable review from Taste of Country, which called it "a subtle change to a formula that’s worked well" and "a stark contrast to more intimate lovers from previous records." The review stated that "Young’s voice adds depth and the necessary hurt to make the early lyrics stick."

Commercial
"Who I Am with You" debuted at number 60 on the U.S. Billboard Country Airplay chart for the week of January 25, 2014. It also debuted at number 49 on the U.S. Billboard Hot Country Songs chart for the week of October 5, 2013. It peaked at number 2 on the Country Airplay chart dated July 26, 2014, having been blocked from Number One by Joe Nichols' "Yeah". The song was certified Gold by the RIAA on July 18, 2014. 
As of August 2014, the song has sold 565,000 copies in the United States.

Music video
The music video was directed by Trey Fanjoy and premiered in March 2014. It shows  footage from Chris's 2013 tour, and him performing the song in his dressing room, as well as cuddling with a love interest there. All the dressing room shots are in color, while the concert and tour footage is in black-and-white.

Charts and certifications

Weekly charts

Year-end charts

Certifications

References

2013 songs
2014 singles
Country ballads
2010s ballads
Chris Young (musician) songs
RCA Records Nashville singles
Songs written by Marv Green
Songs written by Paul Jenkins (songwriter)
Songs written by Jason Sellers
Song recordings produced by James Stroud
Music videos directed by Trey Fanjoy